Arthur Champernowne (1580–c. 1650), of Dartington, near Totnes, Devon was an English politician.  He was the son of Gawine Champernowne and Roberte de Montgomery.  He married Bridget Fulford, daughter of Sir Thomas Fulford, of Great Fulford in Devon on 17 June 1598 in Dunsford.  His son was Captain Francis Champernoun of York, Maine.

He was a Member (MP) of the Parliament of England for Totnes in 1624 and 1626.

He was buried in the old parish church at Dartington.

References

1580 births
1650 deaths
Members of the Parliament of England (pre-1707) for Totnes
English MPs 1624–1625
English MPs 1626